Julio Lobo y Olavarria (30 October 1898– 30 January 1983) was a powerful Cuban sugar trader and financier.  From the late 1930s to 1960, when he left Cuba to go into exile, Lobo was considered the single most powerful sugar broker in the world.  At the time of the start of the Cuban Revolution in 1959, Lobo's fortune was estimated at close to US$200 million ( US$1,800 million in 2020 ).  His assets then included 14 sugar mills, over 30,000 acres of land, a bank, an insurance company, and offices in Havana, New York City, London, Madrid, and Manila.

Following the Cuban revolution of 1959, Lobo was summoned to Havana by Che Guevara. He was informed that all of his sugar mills, other companies, and his houses were being appropriated by the newly formed Communist regime. However, knowing that Lobo was only person in Cuba who knew how to run the sugar refineries, Guevara offered Lobo a job as the head of the sugar industry in Cuba. If he accepted, Lobo would be granted one sugar mill and one personal residence. Lobo told Guevara he needed to think it over. The next day, Lobo boarded his private plane and left Cuba, never to return.

Lobo was born in Caracas (Venezuela) to a father of Sephardi Jewish descent and a Catholic mother, and grew up in Havana, Cuba. As a young man he studied in the United States.  He subsequently married into an old Cuban aristocratic family, the Montalvo family.  Eventually he inherited his father's trading business and turned it into the world's largest sugar trading firm.

A renowned art connoisseur, Lobo also acquired the largest collection of Napoleonic memorabilia outside of France. The collection is housed today in Havana in the former home of Orestes Ferrara, at the Napoleon Museum (Havana). Many of the books and manuscripts from Lobo's collection were moved to the Biblioteca Nacional de Cuba José Martí.

Lobo died in Madrid on January 30, 1983, and is buried at the Almudena Cathedral next to Spain's Palacio Real.

References 

John Paul Rathbone, The Sugar King of Havana: the Rise and Fall of Julio Lobo, Cuba's Last Tycoon (2010)
Sulema Rodríguez Roche and Zoia Rivera, “La Biblioteca de Julio Lobo: Una Aproximación a Su Colección Napoleónica,” Acimed: Revista Cubana de Los Profesionales de La Información y La Comunicación En Salud 17, no. 1 (January 2008): 189–97.

1898 births
1983 deaths
20th-century Cuban businesspeople
Cuban people of Jewish descent
Businesspeople in the sugar industry
Cuban landowners
Venezuelan emigrants to Cuba
Cuban emigrants to the United States